William Wood Farmer (27 April 1813 – 23 October 1854) was an American politician. In 1853 and 1854 he served as Lieutenant Governor of Louisiana.

Life
William Farmer was born in Ouachita Parish, Louisiana. He received an excellent education and he served as one of the first justices of the peace in his home area. He owned a plantation and he worked as a surveyor. Politically he joined the Democratic Party and he served several terms in both chambers of the Louisiana Legislative. In 1852 he was elected to the office of the Lieutenant Governor of Louisiana. He served in this position between 1853 and his death the following year. In this function he was the deputy of Governor Paul Octave Hébert and he presided over the Louisiana State Senate. In October 1854 he travelled to New Orleans on a business trip, where he caught the yellow fever. He did not recover from the disease and died on 23 October still in New Orleans.

External links

 Online Biography

1813 births
1854 deaths
Lieutenant Governors of Louisiana
Louisiana Democrats